Willard James "Dick" Wright (5 May 1890, Worcester, New York - 24 January 1952, Bethlehem, Pennsylvania) was a professional baseball player. He appeared in four games, three as a catcher, in Major League Baseball with the Federal League's Brooklyn Tip-Tops in 1915. He attended Lafayette College and Lehigh University.

Sources

Major League Baseball catchers
Brooklyn Tip-Tops players
Lehigh Mountain Hawks baseball players
Lafayette Leopards baseball players
Baseball players from New York (state)
1890 births
1952 deaths
People from Worcester, New York